The 2004 Missouri Valley Conference men's basketball tournament will be played in St. Louis, Missouri at the conclusion of the 2003–2004 regular season.

Tournament Bracket

See also
 Missouri Valley Conference

References 

2003–04 Missouri Valley Conference men's basketball season
Missouri Valley Conference men's basketball tournament